Holy Innocents is a grade II listed Church of England church in Tottenham Lane, Hornsey, London, England. It was built 1875–77 to designs by Arthur Blomfield.

References

External links 

1875 establishments in England
Arthur Blomfield church buildings
Church of England church buildings in the London Borough of Haringey
Grade II listed churches in London
Hornsey